The term foremost power has been used by political scientists and historians to describe the allegedly greatest power in the world, or in a given region, during a certain period of history. Multiple empires have been described as such, often for the same time period, resulting in a problematic assessment of the conflicting scholarly opinions and points of view on the matter. There is therefore a general lack of consensus between the various authors and scholars in reference to the nations and empires that were allegedly the world's most powerful at various points in history.

The status of foremost power at a global scale implies that of superpower, although it does not necessarily mean that the world is unipolar nor that there is a sole superpower. Currently, the United States is no longer an uncontested superpower, partly due to not dominating in every domain (i.e. military, culture, economy, technology, diplomatic) in every part of the world. And although it is still the most powerful military, has the largest economy by nominal GDP (although China has surpassed the United States in GDP purchasing power parity, and is on track to surpass the United States in nominal GDP at some point in the future), China has made significant gains in cultural influence and technology. The United States became the world's foremost power at the end of the Second World War, as the Soviet Union was a power of comparable influence, but lagged behind the United States in economy and wealth. The United States remained the world's foremost power until the dissolution of the Soviet Union in 1991, at which point it became the world's sole superpower. Opinions differ on when China's rise changed the United States' position of an uncontested sole superpower to a contested one, but most agree that this happened sometime in the late 2000s or early 2010s. While China's rise decreases the power gap between them and the United States, the United States is forecasted to remain the world's foremost power for the next couple decades.

According to the Asia Power Index 2023, the United States still takes the lead on the military capacity, cultural influence, resilience, defense networks, economic resources and future resources but falls behind China in the two parameters of economic relationships and diplomatic influence across eight measures in Asia. The United States remains ahead of China in each of these categories on the global scale. The term "potential superpowers" describes polities that could rival American primacy in the future.

History
The label of foremost power has been given to different empires that even co-existed at their peak. This can be explained by the fact that different scholars work on different sources and have different perspectives on what makes an empire the world's most powerful. For the first century, the term has been applied to both the Roman Empire and the Han Chinese Empire. These two empires covered a similar amount of territory and had a similar population.

In reference to the 16th and 17th centuries, when globalization emerged, the term has been applied to a variety of empires including the Ming Chinese Empire, the Portuguese Empire, the Spanish Empire, their Iberian Union, the Habsburg Empire as a whole, and the Islamic Gunpowder empires of Ottoman Turkey, Mughal India, and Safavid Iran. The Holy Roman Empire and the Kingdom of France were also often considered the foremost powers in Europe, due to their size and population, even if they lacked a global empire comparable to that of other European nations. The Kingdom of England and the Dutch Republic, rising in Europe and globally, have also been described as the "foremost powers" of this period. Giovanni Botero, one of the first scholars of international relations, identified instead the Papacy as the foremost power of the Renaissance and Counter-Reformation era.

During the Cold War, the term has been applied to both the United States and the Soviet Union. The concept of superpower, developed in order to describe these two nations and (earlier) the British Empire, became more common than that of foremost power largely because it was not possible to identity a single hegemonic force in global affairs. This can be considered true for most of history as well.

See also
Superpower
Great power
Middle power
Small power
Hyperpower

References

International relations